The men's long jump event at the 2015 European Athletics U23 Championships was held in Tallinn, Estonia, at Kadriorg Stadium on 9 and 10 July.

Medalists

Results

Final
10 July

Qualifications
9 July

Participation
According to an unofficial count, 20 athletes from 13 countries participated in the event.

References

Long jump
Long jump at the European Athletics U23 Championships